The 2001 Chicago White Sox season was the White Sox's 102nd season, and their 101st in Major League Baseball. They finished with a record of 83-79, good enough for 3rd place in the American League Central, 8 games behind the champion Cleveland Indians.

Offseason 
 December 18, 2000: Sandy Alomar Jr. was signed as a free agent with the Chicago White Sox.

Regular season

Season standings

Record vs. opponents

Opening Day lineup 

Ray Durham, 2B

José Valentín, CF

Frank Thomas, DH

Magglio Ordóñez, RF

Paul Konerko, 1B

Carlos Lee, LF

Herbert Perry, 3B

Sandy Alomar Jr., C

Royce Clayton, SS

David Wells, P

Notable transactions 
 June 20, 2001: José Canseco signed as a free agent with the Chicago White Sox.
 June 29, 2001: Alan Embree was traded by the San Francisco Giants with cash to the Chicago White Sox for Derek Hasselhoff (minors).
 July 26, 2001: James Baldwin was traded by the Chicago White Sox with cash to the Los Angeles Dodgers for Jeff Barry (minors), Gary Majewski (minors) and Onan Masaoka (minors)
 August 23, 2001: Bill Pulsipher was selected off waivers by the Chicago White Sox from the Boston Red Sox.

Roster

Game log 

|- style="text-align:center;background-color:#bbffbb"
| 1 || April 2 || @ Indians || 7–4 || D. Wells (1–0) || Colón (0–1) || Foulke (1) || 2:40 || 42,606 || 1–0 || box
|- style="text-align:center;background-color:#ffbbbb"
| 2 || April 4 || @ Indians || 4–8 || Finley (1–0) || Eldred (0–1) || || 2:45 || 32,763 || 1–1 || box
|- style="text-align:center;background-color:#ffbbbb"
| 3 || April 6 || Tigers || 9 – 10 (10) || Patterson (1–0) || Foulke (0–1) || Jones (1) || 3:38 || 43,954 || 1–2 || box
|- style="text-align:center;background-color:#ffbbbb"
| 4 || April 7 || Tigers || 3–5 || Holt (1–0) || Buehrle (0–1) || Jones (2) || 2:31 || 20,264 || 1–3 || box
|- style="text-align:center;background-color:#ffbbbb"
| 5 || April 8 || Tigers || 3–5 || Weaver (1–1) || D. Wells (1–1) || Jones (3) || 2:49 || 19,887 || 1–4 || box
|- style="text-align:center;background-color:#bbffbb"
| 6 || April 9 || Indians || 9–2 || Biddle (1–0) || Finley (1–1) || || 2:40 || 21,242 || 2–4 || box
|- style="text-align:center;background-color:#bbffbb"
| 7 || April 10 || Indians || 8–7 || Glover (1–0) || Shuey (0–1) || Foulke (2) || 2:56 || 12,465 || 3–4 || box
|- style="text-align:center;background-color:#bbffbb"
| 8 || April 11 || Indians || 7–6 || Lowe (1–0) || Burba (0–1) || Foulke (3) || 2:59 || 12,693 || 4–4 || box
|- style="text-align:center;background-color:#ffbbbb"
| 9 || April 13 || @ Twins || 4–7 || Redman (1–1) || Buehrle (0–2) || Hawkins (1) || 2:34 || 21,202 || 4–5 || box
|- style="text-align:center;background-color:#ffbbbb"
| 10 || April 14 || @ Twins || 4–9 || Radke (3–0) || D. Wells (1–2) || || 2:47 || 26,487 || 4–6 || box
|- style="text-align:center;background-color:#ffbbbb"
| 11 || April 15 || @ Twins || 3–4 || Milton (2–0) || Parque (0–1) || Hawkins (2) || 2:41 || 9,141 || 4–7 || box
|- style="text-align:center;background-color:#ffbbbb"
| 12 || April 17 || @ Tigers || 4–7 || Anderson (1–0) || Wunsch (0–1) || Jones (4) || 2:39 || 13,068 || 4–8 || box
|- style="text-align:center;background-color:#bbffbb"
| 13 || April 18 || @ Tigers || 6–4 || Buehrle (1–2) || Holt (1–2) || Foulke (4) || 2:49 || 13,180 || 5–8 || box
|- style="text-align:center;background-color:#bbffbb"
| 14 || April 19 || @ Tigers || 3–1 || D. Wells (2–2) || Weaver (1–3) || || 2:34 || 14,571 || 6–8 || box
|- style="text-align:center;background-color:#ffbbbb"
| 15 || April 20 || Twins || 1–4 || Radke (4–0) || Parque (0–2) || || 2:25 || 16,557 || 6–9 || box
|- style="text-align:center;background-color:#ffbbbb"
| 16 || April 21 || Twins || 3–4 || Milton (3–0) || Glover (1–1) || Hawkins (4) || 2:15 || 19,096 || 6–10 || box
|- style="text-align:center;background-color:#ffbbbb"
| 17 || April 22 || Twins || 2–4 || Carrasco (2–0) || Foulke (0–2) || Hawkins (5) || 3:03 || 19,730 || 6–11 || box
|- style="text-align:center;background-color:#ffbbbb"
| 18 || April 24 || Athletics || 4–6 || Zito (3–1) || Buehrle (1–3) || Isringhausen (4) || 2:53 || 12,441 || 6–12 || box
|- style="text-align:center;background-color:#bbffbb"
| 19 || April 25 || Athletics || 2 – 1 (11) || Foulke (1–2) || Bradford (0–1) || || 3:48 || 12,941 || 7–12 || box
|- style="text-align:center;background-color:#ffbbbb"
| 20 || April 26 || Athletics || 6–16 || Heredia (1–4) || Parque (0–3) || || 3:22 || 12,963 || 7–13 || box
|- style="text-align:center;background-color:#ffbbbb"
| 21 || April 27 || Mariners || 3–8 || Sele (4–0) || Baldwin (0–1) || Sasaki (12) || 3:22 || 16,276 || 7–14 || box
|- style="text-align:center;background-color:#ffbbbb"
| 22 || April 28 || Mariners || 5–8 || Tomko (1–1) || Biddle (1–1) || Sasaki (13) || 3:38 || 25,542 || 7–15 || box
|- style="text-align:center;background-color:#bbffbb"
| 23 || April 29 || Mariners || 2 – 1 (14) || Glover (2–1) || Franklin (2–1) || || 4:03 || 25,542 || 8–15 || box

|- style="text-align:center;background-color:#ffbbbb"
| 24 || May 1 || @ Angels || 4–6 || Rapp (1–3) || D. Wells (2–3) || Percival (5) || 2:54 || 15,664 || 8–16 || box
|- style="text-align:center;background-color:#ffbbbb"
| 25 || May 2 || @ Angels || 5–12 || Washburn (1–3) || Garland (0–1) || || 3:15 || 15,516 || 8–17 || box
|- style="text-align:center;background-color:#ffbbbb"
| 26 || May 3 || @ Angels || 1–3 || Valdez (2–2) || Baldwin (0–2) || Percival (6) || 2:19 || 15,372 || 8–18 || box
|- style="text-align:center;background-color:#bbbbbb"
| – || May 4 || Rangers ||colspan=8| Postponed (rain), rescheduled for May 5
|- style="text-align:center;background-color:#ffbbbb"
| 27 || May 5 || @ Rangers || 0–2 || Glynn (1–3) || Biddle (1–2) || Zimmerman (3) || 2:28 || 47,674 || 8–19 || box
|- style="text-align:center;background-color:#bbffbb"
| 28 || May 6 || @ Rangers || 10–5 || D. Wells (3–3) || Rogers (1–3) || Foulke (5) || 3:05 || 34,871 || 9–19 || box
|- style="text-align:center;background-color:#bbffbb"
| 29 || May 7 || @ Rangers || 7–4 || Garland (1–1) || Dickey (0–1) || Foulke (6) || 3:20 || 30,073 || 10–19 || box
|- style="text-align:center;background-color:#bbffbb"
| 30 || May 8 || Angels || 2–0 || Baldwin (1–2) || Washburn (1–4) || || 2:11 || 13,187 || 11–19 || box
|- style="text-align:center;background-color:#bbffbb"
| 31 || May 9 || Angels || 6–5 || Howry (1–0) || Levine (1–2) || || 2:52 || 13,458 || 12–19 || box
|- style="text-align:center;background-color:#ffbbbb"
| 32 || May 10 || Angels || 6 – 7 (10) || Percival (2–0) || Foulke (1–3) || || 3:11 || 12,684 || 12–20 || box
|- style="text-align:center;background-color:#bbffbb"
| 33 || May 11 || Rangers || 6 – 5 (10) || Howry (2–0) || Venafro (1–1) || || 3:00 || 19,399 || 13–20 || box
|- style="text-align:center;background-color:#ffbbbb"
| 34 || May 12 || Rangers || 6–16 || Mahomes (2–2) || Garland (1–2) || || 3:42 || 31,647 || 13–21 || box
|- style="text-align:center;background-color:#bbffbb"
| 35 || May 13 || Rangers || 6–3 || Baldwin (2–2) || Helling (1–6) || Foulke (7) || 2:21 || 21,019 || 14–21 || box
|- style="text-align:center;background-color:#ffbbbb"
| 36 || May 15 || @ Mariners || 3–4 || Nelson (2–0) || Howry (2–1) || Paniagua (1) || 3:16 || 31,096 || 14–22 || box
|- style="text-align:center;background-color:#ffbbbb"
| 37 || May 16 || @ Mariners || 2–7 || Abbott (2–1) || Biddle (1–3) || Paniagua (2) || 2:58 || 33,748 || 14–23 || box
|- style="text-align:center;background-color:#ffbbbb"
| 38 || May 17 || @ Mariners || 1–5 || García (4–0) || D. Wells (3–4) || Nelson (3) || 2:53 || 43,510 || 14–24 || box
|- style="text-align:center;background-color:#ffbbbb"
| 39 || May 18 || @ Athletics || 2–3 || Heredia (3–5) || K. Wells (0–1) || Isringhausen (6) || 2:40 || 16,823 || 14–25 || box
|- style="text-align:center;background-color:#ffbbbb"
| 40 || May 19 || @ Athletics || 3–4 || Mulder (5–2) || Baldwin (2–3) || Isringhausen (7) || 2:11 || 30,820 || 14–26 || box
|- style="text-align:center;background-color:#ffbbbb"
| 41 || May 20 || @ Athletics || 2–6 || Hudson (4–3) || Howry (2–2) || || 2:31 || 39,249 || 14–27 || box
|- style="text-align:center;background-color:#ffbbbb"
| 42 || May 21 || @ Blue Jays || 3–10 || Parris (3–3) || Biddle (1–4) || || 2:38 || 20,806 || 14–28 || box
|- style="text-align:center;background-color:#ffbbbb"
| 43 || May 23 || @ Blue Jays || 6–9 || Hamilton (2–2) || D. Wells (3–5) || Koch (10) || 3:08 || 19,115 || 14–29 || box
|- style="text-align:center;background-color:#bbffbb"
| 44 || May 24 || @ Blue Jays || 3–1 || K. Wells (1–1) || Carpenter (4–2) || Foulke (8) || 2:36 || 17,062 || 15–29 || box
|- style="text-align:center;background-color:#bbffbb"
| 45 || May 25 || @ Tigers || 8–4 || Lowe (2–0) || Jones (2–3) || || 3:08 || 21,053 || 16–29 || box
|- style="text-align:center;background-color:#bbffbb"
| 46 || May 26 || @ Tigers || 8–0 || Buehrle (2–3) || Mlicki (3–5) || || 2:39 || 25,881 || 17–29 || box
|- style="text-align:center;background-color:#bbffbb"
| 47 || May 27 || @ Tigers || 3 – 2 (11) || Barceló (1–0) || Patterson (3–2) || Lowe (1) || 3:55 || 17,355 || 18–29 || box
|- style="text-align:center;background-color:#bbffbb"
| 48 || May 28 || Blue Jays || 6–3 || Garland (2–2) || Hamilton (2–3) || Howry (1) || 3:05 || 20,631 || 19–29 || box
|- style="text-align:center;background-color:#ffbbbb"
| 49 || May 29 || Blue Jays || 0–4 || Carpenter (5–2) || K. Wells (1–2) || || 2:47 || 13,356 || 19–30 || box
|- style="text-align:center;background-color:#bbffbb"
| 50 || May 30 || Blue Jays || 4–3 || Wunsch (1–1) || Escobar (0–3) || Foulke (9) || 2:30 || 13,208 || 20–30 || box
|- style="text-align:center;background-color:#bbbbbb"
| – || May 31 || Tigers ||colspan=8| Postponed (rain) Rescheduled for September 4

|- style="text-align:center;background-color:#bbffbb"
| 51 || June 1 || Tigers || 3–0 || Buehrle (3–3) || Mlicki (3–6) || Foulke (10) || 2:34 || 19,840 || 21–30 || box
|- style="text-align:center;background-color:#bbffbb"
| 52 || June 2 || Tigers || 5–3 || D. Wells (4–5) || Weaver (4–6) || Foulke (11) || 2:30 || 23,915 || 22–30 || box
|- style="text-align:center;background-color:#bbffbb"
| 53 || June 3 || Tigers || 9 – 6 (10) || Howry (3–2) || Jones (2–4) || || 3:17 || 19,446 || 23–30 || box
|- style="text-align:center;background-color:#bbffbb"
| 54 || June 5 || @ Royals || 6–2 || K. Wells (2–2) || Reichert (5–5) || Howry (2) || 3:05 || 12,770 || 24–30 || box
|- style="text-align:center;background-color:#ffbbbb"
| 55 || June 6 || @ Royals || 6–12 || Suppan (3–5) || Baldwin (2–4) || || 2:38 || 13,394 || 24–31 || box
|- style="text-align:center;background-color:#bbffbb"
| 56 || June 7 || @ Royals || 5–1 || Buehrle (4–3) || Durbin (3–5) || || 2:27 || 18,957 || 25–31 || box
|- style="text-align:center;background-color:#bbffbb"
| 57 || June 8 || Cubs || 7 – 3 (10) || Foulke (2–3) || Duncan (3–2) || || 3:38 || 45,396 || 26–31 || box
|- style="text-align:center;background-color:#ffbbbb"
| 58 || June 9 || Cubs || 3 – 4 (10) || Van Poppel (3–1) || Foulke (2–4) || Fassero (11) || 3:26 || 45,849 || 26–32 || box
|- style="text-align:center;background-color:#bbffbb"
| 59 || June 10 || Cubs || 3–1 || K. Wells (3–2) || Lieber (6–4) || Howry (3) || 2:41 || 45,079 || 27–32 || box
|- style="text-align:center;background-color:#bbffbb"
| 60 || June 12 || Reds || 5–0 || D. Wells (5–5) || Dessens (5–3) || || 2:26 || 21,687 || 28–32 || box
|- style="text-align:center;background-color:#bbffbb"
| 61 || June 13 || Reds || 4–2 || Buehrle (5–3) || Bell (0–5) || Foulke (12) || 2:27 || 17,327 || 29–32 || box
|- style="text-align:center;background-color:#bbffbb"
| 62 || June 14 || Reds || 7–5 || Wunsch (2–1) || Brower (3–4) || Foulke (13) || 2:52 || 18,201 || 30–32 || box
|- style="text-align:center;background-color:#ffbbbb"
| 63 || June 15 || @ Cardinals || 3–10 || Benes (6–4) || Garland (2–3) || || 2:59 || 42,741 || 30–33 || box
|- style="text-align:center;background-color:#ffbbbb"
| 64 || June 16 || @ Cardinals || 3–8 || Hermanson (6–5) || K. Wells (3–3) || || 3:03 || 43,648 || 30–34 || box
|- style="text-align:center;background-color:#ffbbbb"
| 65 || June 17 || @ Cardinals || 3–8 || Smith (1–0) || D. Wells (5–6) || || 2:52 || 41,515 || 30–35 || box
|- style="text-align:center;background-color:#bbffbb"
| 66 || June 18 || Royals || 5–4 || Buehrle (6–3) || Durbin (4–6) || Foulke (14) || 2:35 || 28,882 || 31–35 || box
|- style="text-align:center;background-color:#bbffbb"
| 67 || June 19 || Royals || 5–3 || Baldwin (3–4) || Suppan (3–6) || Foulke (15) || 2:48 || 18,715 || 32–35 || box
|- style="text-align:center;background-color:#bbffbb"
| 68 || June 20 || Royals || 2–1 || Garland (3–3) || Grimsley (0–3) || Foulke (16) || 2:41 || 21,210 || 33–35 || box
|- style="text-align:center;background-color:#bbffbb"
| 69 || June 21 || @ Orioles || 6–0 || K. Wells (4–3) || Johnson (6–4) || || 2:49 || 34,735 || 34–35 || box
|- style="text-align:center;background-color:#ffbbbb"
| 70 || June 22 || @ Orioles || 4–6 || Mercedes (3–8) || D. Wells (5–7) || Groom (5) || 2:43 || 43,101 || 34–36 || box
|- style="text-align:center;background-color:#bbffbb"
| 71 || June 23 || @ Orioles || 8–3 || Glover (3–1) || Ponson (4–5) || || 3:32 || 40,796 || 35–36 || box
|- style="text-align:center;background-color:#bbffbb"
| 72 || June 24 || @ Orioles || 8–2 || Baldwin (4–4) || Towers (5–2) || Lowe (2) || 3:02 || 40,996 || 36–36 || box
|- style="text-align:center;background-color:#ffbbbb"
| 73 || June 26 || @ Twins || 6–7 || Miller (1–2) || Foulke (2–5) || || 3:19 || 16,200 || 36–37 || box
|- style="text-align:center;background-color:#ffbbbb"
| 74 || June 27 || @ Twins || 1–4 || Lohse (1–0) || K. Wells (4–4) || Hawkins (18) || 2:42 || 19,576 || 36–38 || box
|- style="text-align:center;background-color:#bbffbb"
| 75 || June 28 || @ Twins || 6–3 || Lowe (3–0) || Radke (8–4) || || 2:52 || 19,576 || 37–38 || box
|- style="text-align:center;background-color:#ffbbbb"
| 76 || June 29 || Orioles || 0–4 || Towers (6–2) || Buehrle (6–4) || Trombley (6) || 2:46 || 27,890 || 37–39 || box
|- style="text-align:center;background-color:#bbffbb"
| 77 || June 30 || Orioles || 4–1 || Baldwin (5–4) || Roberts (6–7) || Foulke (17) || 3:11 || 33,439 || 38–39 || box

|- style="text-align:center;background-color:#ffbbbb"
| 78 || July 1 || Orioles || 3–11 || Johnson (7–5) || Biddle (1–5) || || 3:43 || 34,588 || 38–40 || box
|- style="text-align:center;background-color:#ffbbbb"
| 79 || July 2 || Twins || 5–7 || Lohse (2–0) || K. Wells (4–5) || Hawkins (20) || 3:19 || 33,230 || 38–41 || box
|- style="text-align:center;background-color:#ffbbbb"
| 80 || July 3 || Twins || 3–5 || Radke (9–4) || Lowe (3–1) || Hawkins (21) || 2:36 || 17,964 || 38–42 || box
|- style="text-align:center;background-color:#bbffbb"
| 81 || July 4 || Twins || 4–3 || Foulke (3–5) || Hawkins (1–2) || || 2:51 || 22,934 || 39–42 || box
|- style="text-align:center;background-color:#ffbbbb"
| 82 || July 5 || Twins || 2–12 || Mays (11–5) || Baldwin (5–5) || || 3:02 || 20,564 || 39–43 || box
|- style="text-align:center;background-color:#ffbbbb"
| 83 || July 6 || Pirates || 6–10 || Manzanillo (2–2) || Howry (3–3) || || 3:20 || 19,554 || 39–44 || box
|- style="text-align:center;background-color:#bbffbb"
| 84 || July 7 || Pirates || 4–1 || K. Wells (5–5) || Schmidt (5–4) || Foulke (18) || 2:43 || 25,113 || 40–44 || box
|- style="text-align:center;background-color:#bbffbb"
| 85 || July 8 || Pirates || 9–2 || Lowe (4–1) || Ritchie (5–9) || || 2:11 || 22,105 || 41–44 || box
|- style="text-align:center;"
|colspan="11" style="background-color:#bbcaff" | All-Star Break: AL defeats NL 4–1 at Safeco Field
|- style="text-align:center;background-color:#ffbbbb"
| 86 || July 12 || @ Cubs || 1–5 || Fassero (2–2) || Garland (3–4) || || 3:08 || 38,233 || 41–45 || box
|- style="text-align:center;background-color:#bbffbb"
| 87 || July 13 || @ Cubs || 7–2 || Buehrle (7–4) || Wood (8–6) || || 3:01 || 40,157 || 42–45 || box
|- style="text-align:center;background-color:#bbffbb"
| 88 || July 14 || @ Cubs || 3–1 || Lowe (5–1) || Tavárez (6–6) || Foulke (19) || 2:44 || 40,551 || 43–45 || box
|- style="text-align:center;background-color:#bbffbb"
| 89 || July 15 || @ Brewers || 3–2 || Biddle (2–5) || Sheets (10–6) || Foulke (20) || 2:26 || 42,455 || 44–45 || box
|- style="text-align:center;background-color:#bbffbb"
| 90 || July 16 || @ Brewers || 6–5 || Baldwin (6–5) || King (0–2) || Foulke (21) || 3:20 || 42,487 || 45–45 || box
|- style="text-align:center;background-color:#bbffbb"
| 91 || July 17 || @ Brewers || 8–4 || K. Wells (6–5) || Haynes (6–12) || Garland (1) || 2:58 || 40,332 || 46–45 || box
|- style="text-align:center;background-color:#ffbbbb"
| 92 || July 18 || Indians || 4–9 || Sabathia (9–3) || Buehrle (7–5) || || 3:04 || 22,634 || 46–46 || box
|- style="text-align:center;background-color:#ffbbbb"
| 93 || July 19 || Indians || 3–10 || Burba (9–6) || Lowe (5–2) || || 3:01 || 23,450 || 46–47 || box
|- style="text-align:center;background-color:#ffbbbb"
| 94 || July 20 || Red Sox || 2–7 || Nomo (10–4) || Biddle (2–6) || || 3:06 || 28,740 || 46–48 || box
|- style="text-align:center;background-color:#bbffbb"
| 95 || July 21 || Red Sox || 10–3 || Baldwin (7–5) || Ohka (2–5) || || 3:27 || 29,303 || 47–48 || box
|- style="text-align:center;background-color:#bbffbb"
| 96 || July 22 || Red Sox || 13–8 || Garland (4–4) || Wakefield (6–5) || Howry (4) || 3:56 || 26,211 || 48–48 || box
|- style="text-align:center;background-color:#ffbbbb"
| 97 || July 23 || @ Indians || 0–2 || Sabathia (10–3) || Buehrle (7–6) || Wickman (16) || 2:52 || 42,645 || 48–49 || box
|- style="text-align:center;background-color:#bbffbb"
| 98 || July 24 || @ Indians || 4–1 || Lowe (6–2) || Burba (9–7) || Foulke (22) || 2:43 || 42,175 || 49–49 || box
|- style="text-align:center;background-color:#ffbbbb"
| 99 || July 25 || @ Indians || 5–7 || Westbrook (3–2) || Biddle (2–7) || Wickman (17) || 3:04 || 42,645 || 49–50 || box
|- style="text-align:center;background-color:#bbffbb"
| 100 || July 26 || @ Indians || 5–4 || Ginter (1–0) || Nagy (4–4) || Foulke (23) || 2:45 || 42,054 || 50–50 || box
|- style="text-align:center;background-color:#ffbbbb"
| 101 || July 27 || @ Red Sox || 5–9 || Saberhagen (1–0) || K. Wells (6–6) || || 2:42 || 33,813 || 50–51 || box
|- style="text-align:center;background-color:#bbffbb"
| 102 || July 28 || @ Red Sox || 3–1 || Buehrle (8–6) || Wakefield (6–6) || Foulke (24) || 2:53 || 33,316 || 51–51 || box
|- style="text-align:center;background-color:#ffbbbb"
| 103 || July 29 || @ Red Sox || 3–4 || Beck (5–3) || Embree (0–3) || Lowe (21) || 3:02 || 33,375 || 51–52 || box
|- style="text-align:center;background-color:#ffbbbb"
| 104 || July 31 || Royals || 1 – 2 (10) || Byrd (3–5) || Foulke (3–6) || Hernández (18) || 2:53 || 18,581 || 51–53 || box

|- style="text-align:center;background-color:#bbffbb"
| 105 || August 1 || Royals || 7–6 || Wright (1–0) || George (0–2) || Foulke (25) || 3:12 || 15,620 || 52–53 || box
|- style="text-align:center;background-color:#ffbbbb"
| 106 || August 2 || Royals || 3–6 || Suppan (5–9) || K. Wells (6–7) || Hernández (19) || 2:48 || 16,021 || 52–54 || box
|- style="text-align:center;background-color:#bbffbb"
| 107 || August 3 || Devil Rays || 4–0 || Buehrle (9–6) || Bierbrodt (2–3) || || 2:12 || 19,330 || 53–54 || box
|- style="text-align:center;background-color:#bbffbb"
| 108 || August 4 || Devil Rays || 8–6 || Biddle (3–7) || Kennedy (3–7) || Foulke (26) || 3:14 || 28,952 || 54–54 || box
|- style="text-align:center;background-color:#ffbbbb"
| 109 || August 5 || Devil Rays || 4–6 || Zambrano (4–1) || Howry (3–4) || Yan (14) || 2:55 || 21,443 || 54–55 || box
|- style="text-align:center;background-color:#bbffbb"
| 110 || August 6 || Devil Rays || 5–2 || Wright (2–0) || Wallace (0–3) || Foulke (27) || 2:52 || 26,944 || 55–55 || box
|- style="text-align:center;background-color:#ffbbbb"
| 111 || August 7 || @ Angels || 3–9 || Rapp (5–9) || K. Wells (6–8) || || 2:36 || 18,498 || 55–56 || box
|- style="text-align:center;background-color:#bbffbb"
| 112 || August 8 || @ Angels || 15–1 || Buehrle (10–6) || Washburn (9–6) || || 2:42 || 18,864 || 56–56 || box
|- style="text-align:center;background-color:#ffbbbb"
| 113 || August 9 || @ Angels || 2–3 || Valdez (8–6) || Lowe (6–3) || Percival (31) || 2:18 || 17,896 || 56–57 || box
|- style="text-align:center;background-color:#bbffbb"
| 114 || August 10 || @ Mariners || 8–6 || Biddle (4–7) || Sasaki (0–4) || Foulke (28) || 3:19 || 45,665 || 57–57 || box
|- style="text-align:center;background-color:#ffbbbb"
| 115 || August 11 || @ Mariners || 3–4 || Franklin (5–1) || Foulke (3–7) || || 3:04 || 45,898 || 57–58 || box
|- style="text-align:center;background-color:#ffbbbb"
| 116 || August 12 || @ Mariners || 1–2 || Rhodes (7–0) || K. Wells (6–9) || Sasaki (37) || 2:48 || 45,765 || 57–59 || box
|- style="text-align:center;background-color:#bbffbb"
| 117 || August 14 || Rangers || 7–4 || Buehrle (11–6) || Myette (1–2) || Foulke (29) || 2:53 || 22,336 || 58–59 || box
|- style="text-align:center;background-color:#bbffbb"
| 118 || August 15 || Rangers || 6–5 || K. Wells (7–9) || Mahomes (5–5) || Foulke (30) || 3:12 || 18,062 || 59–59 || box
|- style="text-align:center;background-color:#bbffbb"
| 119 || August 16 || Rangers || 7–5 || K. Wells (8–9) || Petkovsek (1–2) || Foulke (31) || 3:24 || 20,252 || 60–59 || box
|- style="text-align:center;background-color:#ffbbbb"
| 120 || August 17 || Athletics || 2–9 || Hiljus (2–0) || Wright (2–1) || || 3:05 || 33,834 || 60–60 || box
|- style="text-align:center;background-color:#ffbbbb"
| 121 || August 18 || Athletics || 4–5 || Heredia (7–8) || Howry (3–5) || Isringhausen (24) || 3:08 || 27,861 || 60–61 || box
|- style="text-align:center;background-color:#ffbbbb"
| 122 || August 19 || Athletics || 7–8 || Magnante (2–1) || Biddle (4–8) || Isringhausen (25) || 3:42 || 25,019 || 60–62 || box
|- style="text-align:center;background-color:#ffbbbb"
| 123 || August 20 || @ Royals || 1–10 || Stein (5–6) || Lowe (6–4) || || 2:24 || 13,842 || 60–63 || box
|- style="text-align:center;background-color:#bbffbb"
| 124 || August 21 || @ Royals || 6–1 || Garland (5–4) || Byrd (6–6) || || 2:49 || 12,391 || 61–63 || box
|- style="text-align:center;background-color:#bbffbb"
| 125 || August 22 || @ Royals || 13–12 || K. Wells (9–9) || Henry (2–1) || Foulke (32) || 3:51 || 11,670 || 62–63 || box
|- style="text-align:center;background-color:#bbffbb"
| 126 || August 23 || @ Royals || 7–6 || Biddle (5–8) || Suppan (7–11) || Foulke (33) || 3:15 || 13,541 || 63–63 || box
|- style="text-align:center;background-color:#bbffbb"
| 127 || August 24 || @ Devil Rays || 5–4 || Buehrle (12–6) || Sturtze (8–10) || Foulke (34) || 2:21 || 10,650 || 64–63 || box
|- style="text-align:center;background-color:#ffbbbb"
| 128 || August 25 || @ Devil Rays || 4–8 || Kennedy (5–8) || Wright (2–2) || || 3:12 || 26,597 || 64–64 || box
|- style="text-align:center;background-color:#bbffbb"
| 129 || August 26 || @ Devil Rays || 3–2 || Garland (6–4) || Seay (0–1) || Foulke (35) || 2:52 || 19,182 || 65–64 || box
|- style="text-align:center;background-color:#bbffbb"
| 130 || August 28 || @ Tigers || 8–6 || Embree (1–3) || Patterson (5–4) || Howry (5) || 2:59 || 19,129 || 66–64 || box
|- style="text-align:center;background-color:#bbffbb"
| 131 || August 29 || @ Tigers || 8–3 || Glover (4–1) || Redman (2–6) || || 3:19 || 21,998 || 67–64 || box
|- style="text-align:center;background-color:#ffbbbb"
| 132 || August 30 || @ Tigers || 1–3 || Cornejo (3–1) || Buehrle (12–7) || Anderson (16) || 2:04 || 24,364 || 67–65 || box
|- style="text-align:center;background-color:#bbffbb"
| 133 || August 31 || Indians || 11–8 || Howry (4–5) || Westbrook (3–4) || Foulke (36) || 3:22 || 24,097 || 68–65 || box

|- style="text-align:center;background-color:#ffbbbb"
| 134 || September 1 || Indians || 3–4 || Drese (1–0) || Garland (6–5) || Wickman (27) || 3:27 || 27,869 || 68–66 || box
|- style="text-align:center;background-color:#bbffbb"
| 135 || September 2 || Indians || 19–10 || Biddle (6–8) || Burba (10–9) || || 3:32 || 25,680 || 69–66 || box
|- style="text-align:center;background-color:#ffbbbb"
| 136 || September 3 || Indians || 3–6 || Sabathia (15–4) || Glover (4–2) || Wickman (28) || 2:47 || 28,135 || 69–67 || box
|- style="text-align:center;background-color:#bbffbb"
| 137 || September 4 || Tigers || 10–1 || Buehrle (13–7) || Cornejo (3–2) || || 2:41 || N/A || 70–67 || box
|- style="text-align:center;background-color:#bbffbb"
| 138 || September 4 || Tigers || 4–0 || Lowe (7–4) || Pettyjohn (0–6) || || 2:31 || 13,265 || 71–67 || box
|- style="text-align:center;background-color:#bbffbb"
| 139 || September 5 || Tigers || 5–3 || Wright (3–2) || Sparks (10–9) || Foulke (37) || 2:45 || 14,576 || 72–67 || box
|- style="text-align:center;background-color:#ffbbbb"
| 140 || September 6 || Tigers || 2–6 || Weaver (11–14) || Garland (6–6) || || 3:27 || 13,602 || 72–68 || box
|- style="text-align:center;background-color:#bbffbb"
| 141 || September 7 || @ Indians || 10–7 || Biddle (7–8) || Burba (10–10) || Foulke (38) || 3:28 || 42,487 || 73–68 || box
|- style="text-align:center;background-color:#ffbbbb"
| 142 || September 8 || @ Indians || 7–8 || Báez (5–1) || Foulke (3–8) || || 3:13 || 42,488 || 73–69 || box
|- style="text-align:center;background-color:#ffbbbb"
| 143 || September 9 || @ Indians || 8–9 || Wickman (5–0) || Foulke (3–9) || || 3:25 || 42,377 || 73–70 || box
|- style="text-align:center;background-color:#bbffbb"
| 144 || September 10 || @ Indians || 7–1 || Wright (4–2) || Colón (12–11) || || 3:26 || 38,244 || 74–70 || box
|- style="text-align:center;background-color:#bbbbbb"
| – || September 11 || @ Yankees ||colspan=8| Postponed (September 11 attacks), rescheduled for October 1
|- style="text-align:center;background-color:#bbbbbb"
| – || September 12 || @ Yankees ||colspan=8| Postponed (September 11 attacks), rescheduled for October 2
|- style="text-align:center;background-color:#bbbbbb"
| – || September 13 || @ Yankees ||colspan=8| Postponed (September 11 attacks), rescheduled for October 3
|- style="text-align:center;background-color:#bbbbbb"
| – || September 14 || @ Twins ||colspan=8| Postponed (September 11 attacks), rescheduled for October 5
|- style="text-align:center;background-color:#bbbbbb"
| – || September 15 || @ Twins ||colspan=8| Postponed (September 11 attacks), rescheduled for October 6
|- style="text-align:center;background-color:#bbbbbb"
| – || September 16 || @ Twins ||colspan=8| Postponed (September 11 attacks), rescheduled for October 7
|- style="text-align:center;background-color:#ffbbbb"
| 145 || September 18 || Yankees || 3–11 || Hernández (3–6) || Buehrle (13–8) || || 2:57 || 22,785 || 74–71 || box
|- style="text-align:center;background-color:#ffbbbb"
| 146 || September 19 || Yankees || 3–6 || Clemens (20–1) || Glover (4–3) || Rivera (46) || 3:05 || 18,465 || 74–72 || box
|- style="text-align:center;background-color:#bbffbb"
| 147 || September 20 || Yankees || 7–5 || Lowe (8–4) || Pettitte (15–10) || Foulke (39) || 3:18 || 22,284 || 75–72 || box
|- style="text-align:center;background-color:#bbffbb"
| 148 || September 21 || Royals || 8–7 || Lowe (9–4) || Henry (2–2) || || 3:10 || 15,404 || 76–72 || box
|- style="text-align:center;background-color:#bbffbb"
| 149 || September 22 || Royals || 5 – 4 (10) || Foulke (4–9) || Stein (5–8) || || 4:04 || 24,307 || 77–72 || box
|- style="text-align:center;background-color:#bbffbb"
| 150 || September 23 || Royals || 10–2 || Buehrle (14–8) || Durbin (7–16) || || 2:30 || 19,014 || 78–72 || box
|- style="text-align:center;background-color:#ffbbbb"
| 151 || September 25 || Twins || 2–4 || Mays (17–13) || Glover (4–4) || Guardado (8) || 2:49 || 11,973 || 78–73 || box
|- style="text-align:center;background-color:#bbffbb"
| 152 || September 26 || Twins || 6–3 || K. Wells (10–9) || Reed (12–10) || Foulke (40) || 2:49 || 13,006 || 79–73 || box
|- style="text-align:center;background-color:#bbffbb"
| 153 || September 27 || Twins || 9–3 || Wright (5–2) || Radke (13–11) || Lowe (3) || 2:51 || 13,567 || 80–73 || box
|- style="text-align:center;background-color:#ffbbbb"
| 154 || September 28 || @ Royals || 2–3 || Durbin (8–16) || Embree (1–4) || Hernández (27) || 2:40 || 14,914 || 80–74 || box
|- style="text-align:center;background-color:#bbffbb"
| 155 || September 29 || @ Royals || 10–2 || Buehrle (15–8) || Suppan (9–14) || || 3:06 || 16,443 || 81–74 || box
|- style="text-align:center;background-color:#bbffbb"
| 156 || September 30 || @ Royals || 5–2 || Glover (5–4) || George (4–7) || Foulke (41) || 2:45 || 12,235 || 82–74 || box
|- style="text-align:center;background-color:#ffbbbb"
| 157 || October 1 || @ Yankees || 1–8 || Hitchcock (6–5) || K. Wells (10–10) || || 2:48 || 8,112 || 82–75 || box
|- style="text-align:center;background-color:#ffbbbb"
| 158 || October 2 || @ Yankees || 4–6 || Lilly (5–6) || Wright (5–3) || Rivera (48) || 3:15 || 10,480 || 82–76 || box
|- style="text-align:center;background-color:#ffbbbb"
| 159 || October 3 || @ Yankees || 1–2 || Mussina (17–11) || Garland (6–7) || Rivera (49) || 2:49 || 14,895 || 82–77 || box
|- style="text-align:center;background-color:#bbffbb"
| 160 || October 5 || @ Twins || 7–4 || Buehrle (16–8) || Reed (12–12) || Foulke (42) || 2:50 || 13,631 || 83–77 || box
|- style="text-align:center;background-color:#ffbbbb"
| 161 || October 6 || @ Twins || 5–6 || Cressend (3–2) || Glover (5–5) || Guardado (11) || 2:56 || 18,599 || 83–78 || box
|- style="text-align:center;background-color:#ffbbbb"
| 162 || October 7 || @ Twins || 5–8 || Radke (15–11) || K. Wells (10–11) || Guardado (12) || 2:46 || 14,413 || 83–79 || box

Player stats

Batting 
Note: G = Games played; AB = At bats; R = Runs scored; H = Hits; 2B = Doubles; 3B = Triples; HR = Home runs; RBI = Runs batted in; BB = Base on balls; SO = Strikeouts; AVG = Batting average; SB = Stolen bases

Pitching 
Note: W = Wins; L = Losses; ERA = Earned run average; G = Games pitched; GS = Games started; SV = Saves; IP = Innings pitched; H = Hits allowed; R = Runs allowed; ER = Earned runs allowed; HR = Home runs allowed; BB = Walks allowed; K = Strikeouts

Farm system

External links 
 2001 Chicago White Sox at Baseball Reference

References 

Chicago White Sox seasons
Chicago White Sox season
White